Hugo Larsson may refer to:

 Hugo Larsson (engineer) (1906–1986), Swedish engineer and civil servant
 Hugo Larsson (footballer) (born 2004), Swedish footballer